Vollant is a French surname. Notable people with the surname include:

 Simon Vollant (1622–1694), French engineer, entrepreneur, and architect
 Florent Vollant (born 1959), Canadian singer-songwriter
 Stanley Vollant (born 1965), Canadian surgeon

French-language surnames